Professor Raymond Leonard Powles CBE, FRCP, FRCPath (born 1938), known as Ray, is a British physician.

His identical twin, Professor Trevor Powles, is also a doctor.

In 1973 he performed the first successful bone marrow transplant in Europe. and pioneered in 1978 the use of cyclosporine in bone marrow transplantation, published simultaneously with Sir Roy Calne for kidney transplantation. In 1983 he, in conjunction with Prof Tim McElwain reported  the first autologous stem cell transplant for multiple myeloma

He was Physician-in-Charge (from 1974) and Group Head for Haemato-Oncology (from 1993) at the Leukaemia and Myeloma Units of the Royal Marsden Hospital.

He was also, from 1977, Professor of Haemato-Oncology at the University of London, Institute of Cancer Research.

Ray and Trevor were each made Commanders of the Order of the British Empire (CBE) in 2002 for their services to medicine. Together, they received Lifetime Achievement awards in the 2013 Pride of Britain awards, presented to them by the then-prime minister, David Cameron.

References

External links 

 
 

1938 births
British identical twins
Place of birth missing (living people)
Commanders of the Order of the British Empire
Fellows of the Royal College of Pathologists
Living people